Mastermind is an Australian television quiz show aired on the Special Broadcasting Service (SBS). Produced by BBC Studios, the series is based on the original British game show of the same name created by Bill Wright. The show features an intimidating setting with challenging questions on specialised subjects of the contestant's choice, followed by a general knowledge round.

History 
The program was first announced in March 2019, with Jennifer Byrne hosting the first two seasons of the show. The show was temporarily hosted by Marc Fennell for a period of about two weeks after Byrne had a fall that left her with injuries to her wrist and face.

The finals of the second season were delayed by nearly a year due to the COVID-19 pandemic, returning in February 2021.

Fennell took over as host of the show from the third season, which began that same month.

Two seasons of Celebrity Mastermind have also been produced.

Format 
Standard episodes consist of two rounds. In the first round, each contender will have two minutes to answer as many questions as possible about their chosen specialist subject. In the second round, contestants face 90 seconds of general knowledge questions. There are four contestants in each episode from Monday to Thursday, and the winner of each episode competes in the weekly final on Friday, in order to advance to the semi-final.

Weekly finals episodes place the general knowledge round first, followed by a Slow Burn round (from Season 2 onwards), unique to the Australian version. In Slow Burn, each contestant must pick a category from the four available. They are then presented ten clues, one at a time. The contestant can only make one guess. The earlier they answer, the more points they earn; ten points if they answer after the first clue, minus one for each clue they hear afterwards before answering. Zero points are earned if the answer is wrong.

The grand final episode of each season is 60 minutes long, instead of the usual 30 minutes, and consists of three rounds: A new specialist subject for each contestant, a Slow Burn round, and finally a general knowledge round. The winner of the grand final, and the season, is awarded a handcrafted, etched glass bowl, made by indigenous artist Dennis Golding.

Episodes

Footnotes

References

External links 

 

English-language television shows
2019 Australian television series debuts
2010s Australian television series
Television shows set in Sydney